The Second Hollway Ministry was the 56th ministry of the Government of Victoria. It was led by the Premier of Victoria, Thomas Hollway and Deputy Premier Alexander Dennett. Hollway and the rest of the ministry were not aligned to a political party at the time, although they would later form the Electoral Reform League to contest the December 1952 election, and had been recently expelled from the parliamentary Liberal and Country Party. With the help of two Hollway supporters in the Victorian Legislative Council, the Labor Party blocked supply to John McDonald's Country Party government, and indicated that they would support Hollway as Premier.

The ministry was the shortest-lived ministry in Victoria's political history, lasting only seventy hours. The cabinet was sworn in at noon on 28 October 1952, but was ordered to resign on the morning of 31 October after Hollway's request to the Governor of Victoria for a dissolution of parliament was refused. John McDonald was asked to re-form a government, and an election was called for 6 December.

Portfolios

References

Hollway Ministry 2
Ministries of Elizabeth II